Judit Simics (later Zsembery, born 28 September 1967 in Mohács) is a Hungarian former handball player who competed in the 2000 Summer Olympics, where she won the silver medal with the Hungarian team. She played on six matches and scored three goals.  In 1994, she married men's handball goalkeeper Tamás Zsembery.

In January 2023 she became the head coach of Érd HC.

References

1967 births
Living people
People from Mohács
Hungarian female handball players
Olympic handball players of Hungary
Handball players at the 2000 Summer Olympics
Olympic silver medalists for Hungary
Olympic medalists in handball
Medalists at the 1996 Summer Olympics
Olympic bronze medalists for Hungary
Sportspeople from Baranya County